"Capua" euryochra is a species of moth of the family Tortricidae. It is found in Australia, where it has been recorded from Queensland and New South Wales.

The wingspan is 12–13 mm. The forewings are pale-brownish with a large basal patch outlined with dark-fuscous and a dark-fuscous median fascia. The hindwings are grey.

Taxonomy
The species does not belong in the genus Capua and should be placed in a new genus.

References

Moths described in 1916
Archipini